Next Door is a German dark comedy-drama film directed by Daniel Brühl and written by Daniel Kehlmann. The film stars Daniel Brühl and Peter Kurth.

The film had its worldwide premiere at the 71st Berlin International Film Festival in March 2021.

Cast
 Daniel Brühl as Daniel Weltz
 Peter Kurth as Bruno
 Rike Eckermann as Hilde
 Aenne Schwarz as Clara
 Gode Benedix as Micha
 Vicky Krieps as Actress		
 Mex Schlüpfer as Guido
 Stefan Scheumann as Dirk
 Nils Doergelo as Nils

Release
On February 11, 2021, Berlinale announced that the film would have its worldwide premiere at the 71st Berlin International Film Festival in the Berlinale Competition section, in March 2021.

References

External links
 

German drama films
2021 directorial debut films